Tomasz Maciej Świątek (born 26 July 1964) is a Polish rower. He competed in the men's quadruple sculls event at the 1988 Summer Olympics, in which Poland won the "B" Final to finish seventh overall.

Sports career
At the 1987 Universiade, Świątek won the gold medal. Świątek was associated with the Polish university sports club AZS Warsaw. Świątek represented Poland at the men's quadruple sculls event at the 1988 Summer Olympics, where he placed seventh.

Personal life and awards
Świątek is the father of Polish tennis player Iga Świątek, who is the first ever Polish player of either gender to be ranked world no. 1, and also the first ever player of either gender born in the 2000s to achieve the top ranking. After his daughter won the 2020 French Open women's singles title, they were both awarded Polish honours in a joint ceremony: his daughter received a Gold Cross of Merit and he was conferred an Officer's Cross of the Order of Polonia Restituta "for sports achievements, for promoting Poland in the international arena".

References

External links
 

1964 births
Living people
Polish male rowers
Olympic rowers of Poland
Rowers at the 1988 Summer Olympics
Rowers from Warsaw
Universiade gold medalists for Poland
Universiade medalists in rowing
Medalists at the 1987 Summer Universiade